William Cupit (25 January 1908 – 1992) was an English professional footballer who played in the Football League for Luton Town and Mansfield Town.

References

1908 births
1992 deaths
English footballers
Association football forwards
English Football League players
Luton Town F.C. players
Mansfield Town F.C. players